The Mississippi Department of Mental Health (DMH) is a state agency of Mississippi, headquartered in Suite 1101 of the Robert E. Lee Building in Jackson. It provides mental health services.

Facilities
 Mississippi State Hospital
 East Mississippi State Hospital
 North Mississippi State Hospital
 South Mississippi State Hospital
 Central Mississippi Residential Center
 Specialized Treatment Facility

References

External links

 Mississippi Department of Mental Health

State agencies of Mississippi
State departments of health of the United States
Medical and health organizations based in Mississippi